Big Run is an unincorporated community in Marion County, West Virginia, United States. It lies along Big Run, the stream from which it takes its name.

References 

Unincorporated communities in Marion County, West Virginia
Unincorporated communities in West Virginia